Motor Enthusiasts' Club (MEC) is a motor club based in Dublin, Ireland.

History

The club was set up in 1957 and some of the original members are still actively involved. The club boasts diverse club activities and involvement in Irish motorsport. Two of MEC past directors have held the position of President of Motorsport Ireland. As of 2019, 4 current club members are representatives in the Motorsport Council, the biggest representation of any club.

In 2015 MEC has won the Dick Bailey Award for the best run event in the opinion of the registered competitors for the 2nd year in a row.

Long time member Frank Nuttall has been awarded the Jimmy Millard trophy by Motorsport Ireland for his contribution to Motorsport in Ireland over many decades.

In March 2019, in the run-up to 2020 event application, MEC issued open letter via Facebook, urging more and younger members to participate in the club events.

Events

MEC organise and run a diverse variety of Motorsport events in both motorbike and car disciplines:

 Sporting Trials (MEC Mudplug Championship)
 Autotests
 Track Racing
 Hillclimb/Sprints
 Rally Sprints
 Motorcycle Trials

In the past MEC also ran:
 Rallies
 Circuit Racing
 Autocross
 4×4 Trials

MEC members participated in the above events, as well as Classic, Enduro, Formula Libre, Formula Vee, Grasstrack, GT, Motocross, Rallycross events organized by other clubs.

Notable events 
In 2019 MEC ran Mondello Park Race Meeting on 8–9 June.

MEC ran annual Mondello Park Rallysprint event at the beginning of December for over a decade. The 2016 and 2017 events were cancelled as participant numbers were too low to go ahead. The event was removed from the calendar since then.

In 1995 MEC hosted a round of The World Trials Championship on the Sugarloaf in County Wicklow.

See also

 List of Irish Motor Clubs
 Mondello Park

External links
 Official website
 Official Facebook page

References 

Motorsport in the Republic of Ireland